The Marcha de las Malvinas (in English: March of the Falklands) is a patriotic anthem of Argentina. It is sung in demonstrations to assert Argentina sovereignty claims over the Falkland Islands (in Spanish: Islas Malvinas) and was prominently broadcast by the military government (controlled media during the Falklands War).

On March 3, 1948, it was premiered by the Argentine National Symphony Orchestra.

Since 2017, it is also the official anthem of Tierra del Fuego, Antarctica, and South Atlantic Islands province.

The lyrics were written by the Argentine poet Carlos Obligado and the music was composed by José Tieri. They won a 1939 contest organised by the Junta de Recuperación de las Malvinas (Falklands Recovery Commission).

Lyrics

References

External links 
 MP3 at the Argentine website "El Malvinense"

Argentine military marches
1939 songs
Falkland Islands sovereignty dispute
Songs about South America
Songs about Argentina